Five referendums were held in Switzerland in 1988. The first two were held on 12 June on a federal resolution on the constitutional principles behind a co-ordinated transport policy and on a popular initiative on lowering the retirement age to 62 for men and 60 for women. Both were rejected by voters. The final three referendums were held on 3 December on three popular initiatives "against real estate speculation", "for the shortening of labour time" and on limiting immigration. All three were rejected.

Results

June: Co-ordinated transport policy

June: Lowering the retirement age

December: Popular initiative against real estate speculation

December: Popular initiative on shortening working hours

December: Popular initiative on limiting immigration

References

1988 referendums
1988 in Switzerland
Referendums in Switzerland